Gull Rock is a rock formation and a small rocky island in Marin County, in the U.S. state of California. It lies in the Pacific Ocean just offshore of the Golden Gate National Recreation Area.

References

See also
List of islands of California

Islands of Marin County, California
Islands of the San Francisco Bay Area
Islands of Northern California
Uninhabited islands of California
Geology of Marin County, California
West Marin
Pacific islands of California